Mantsi (also known as Ma’as or Mangas) is an endangered Afro-Asiatic language spoken in Mangas town in Bauchi State, Nigeria. Blench (2020) reports that it is also called Mantsi. According to Blench, the structure of Mantsi differs significantly from the other South Bauchi languages.

Word lists of Mantsi had previously been published in Kiyoshi Shimizu's (1978) South Bauchi survey, which first mentioned the existence of the language. An unpublished word list was also recorded by Ronald Cosper (n.d.).

Names
Mantsi speakers refer to their language as Pyik Mantsi [pʲìk mántsì], and to themselves as the Mantsi [mántsì] people. Although there are fewer than 1,000 speakers, the language is still being spoken by children.

Demographics
Mantsi is spoken in the single village of Mantsi (locally known as Maɗana [mánànā] or Ma’as [màʔās]) in the southern part of Bauchi LGA, Bauchi State. The Kir [Kyiir] and Laar peoples, who speak closely related but distinct languages, live just to the northeast of Mantsi village in the nearby villages of Kir and Laar, respectively.

Classification
Mantsi belongs to the Kir branch of the South Bauchi languages. It is most closely related to Kir and Laar, as shown by the lexical comparisons below.

Mantsi also has some lexical innovations, which are:

Phonology
Mantsi has 3 level tones, as well as rising and falling contour tones.

Grammar
Number is not marked morphologically.

Lexicon

Plants and animals
Some Mantsi names of plants and animals:

Numerals
Mantsi numerals:

Notes 

West Chadic languages
Languages of Nigeria
Endangered languages